Jemielno  is a village in Góra County, Lower Silesian Voivodeship, in south-western Poland. It is the seat of the administrative district (gmina) called Gmina Jemielno.

References

Jemielno